The De la Roquette Islands are members of the Canadian Arctic Archipelago in the territory of Nunavut. They lie in Peel Sound, northwest of Somerset Island's Fitz Roy Inlet. Strzelecki Harbour on Prince of Wales Island is to the west.

Uninhabited islands of Kitikmeot Region